The following Confederate States Army units and commanders fought in the Battle of Peebles's Farm from September 30 to October 2, 1864. The Union order of battle is listed separately.

Abbreviations used

Military rank
 Gen = General
 LTG = Lieutenant General
 MG = Major General
 BG = Brigadier General
 Col = Colonel
 Ltc = Lieutenant Colonel
 Maj = Major
 Cpt = Captain
 Lt = Lieutenant

Other
 w = wounded
 mw = mortally wounded
 k = killed

Army of Northern Virginia

Third Corps
LTG A. P. Hill

Cavalry Corps
MG Wade Hampton III

Sources
 Katcher, Philip R.N. The Army of Northern Virginia: Lee's Army in the American Civil War, 1861-1865. London, United Kingdom: Fitzroy Dearborn, 2003. .

American Civil War orders of battle